Debbie Crosbie (born 1969/1970) is a British banker, and the chief executive of the Nationwide Building Society since June 2022. She was previously the CEO of TSB Bank from May 2019.

Early life
Debbie Crosbie was born and raised in Glasgow, the daughter of an engineer father and a care worker mother. She earned a bachelor's degree from the University of Strathclyde.

Career
Crosbie started her career in the Prudential graduate training programme, working in the City of London. In 1997, she joined Clydesdale Bank as a project manager. She has worked for CYBG since 1997, rising to chief operating officer (COO) in January 2015.

In November 2018, TSB Bank announced Crosbie as its new CEO, to succeed Paul Pester in May 2019.

In June 2022, Crosbie succeeded Joe Garner, as chief executive of the Nationwide Building Society.

References

British bankers
Scottish bankers
British chief executives
Living people
Women chief executives
Alumni of the University of Strathclyde
Businesspeople from Glasgow
Prudential plc people
Year of birth missing (living people)